Seemanthini is a 1978 Indian Malayalam film, directed by P. G. Vishwambharan and produced by N. Sarathkumar. The film stars Madhu, Jayabharathi, Kaviyoor Ponnamma and Jose in the lead roles. The film has musical score by Jaya Vijaya.

Cast
Madhu 
Jayabharathi
Sudheer 
Jose 
Sathar
Seema
Kaviyoor Ponnamma

Soundtrack
The music was composed by Jaya Vijaya and the lyrics were written by Biju Ponneth.

References

External links
 

1978 films
1970s Malayalam-language films
Films directed by P. G. Viswambharan
Films scored by Jaya Vijaya